National Secondary Route 205, or just Route 205 (or ) is a National Road Route of Costa Rica, located in the San José province.

Description
In San José province the route covers Goicoechea canton (Guadalupe, Mata de Plátano, Rancho Redondo districts).

References

Highways in Costa Rica